Jean-Pierre Nel is a South African rugby league player for the Tuks Bulls. His position is centre and second row. He is a South African international, and has played in the 2013 Rugby League World Cup qualifying against Jamaica and the USA. He represented South Africa in the Middle East-Africa play-offs for the 2017 Rugby League World Cup.

References

Nel, JP
Nel, JP
Tuks Bulls players
Rugby league centres
Rugby league second-rows